Adam Neill (born 29 May 1990) is a British rower.

Rowing career
Neill made his Great Britain junior debut in 2008 and senior debut in 2017. He won the Ladies Plate at the Henley Royal Regatta in 2016 and is twice the indoor national champion. He won a bronze medal at the 2018 World Rowing Championships in Plovdiv, Bulgaria, as part of the coxless four with Thomas Ford, Jacob Dawson and James Johnston.

References

Living people
1990 births
British male rowers
World Rowing Championships medalists for Great Britain